Muckle Holm is the name of a number of islands in Orkney and Shetland. It is an oxymoron, since muckle means "big" and "holm" refers to an islet.

Orkney
 Muckle Green Holm

Shetland
 Muckle Holm, Yell Sound, in Yell Sound between Sandwick on Yell, and Burravoe, Mainland

See also
 Muckle Skerry
 Stoura Stack
 Muckle Ossa